Thomas Trentham (1575–1605) was an English politician.

He was the second son of Thomas Trentham and educated at Balliol College, Oxford (1591).

He was a Member (MP) of the Parliament of England for Newcastle-under-Lyme in 1601.

References

1575 births
1605 deaths
Alumni of Balliol College, Oxford
16th-century English people
Members of the Parliament of England for Newcastle-under-Lyme
English MPs 1601